The 1958–59 Duke Blue Devils men's basketball team represented Duke University in the 1958–59 NCAA University Division men's basketball season. The head coach was Harold Bradley and the team finished the season with an overall record of 13–12. This was the last season with Harold Bradley as their coach, as he left the following year to Texas.

References 

Duke Blue Devils men's basketball seasons
Duke
1958 in sports in North Carolina
1959 in sports in North Carolina